The cycle per second is a once-common English name for the unit of frequency now known as the hertz (Hz). Cycles per second may be denoted by c.p.s., c/s, or, ambiguously, just "cycles" (Cyc., Cy., C, or c). The term comes from repetitive phenomena such as sound waves having a frequency measurable as a number of oscillations, or cycles, per second. 

With the organization of the International System of Units in 1960, the cycle per second was officially replaced by the hertz, or reciprocal second, "s−1" or "1/s". Symbolically, "cycle per second" units are "cycle/second", while hertz is "Hz" or "s−1". For higher frequencies, kilocycles (kc), as an abbreviation of kilocycles per second were often used on components or devices. Other higher units like megacycle (Mc) and less commonly kilomegacycle (kMc) were used before 1960
and in some later documents.  These have modern equivalents such as kilohertz (kHz), megahertz (MHz), and gigahertz (GHz). Following the introduction of the SI standard, use of these terms began to fall off in favor of the new unit, with hertz becoming the dominant convention in both academic and colloquial speech by the 1970s.

The rate at which aperiodic or stochastic events occur may be expressed in becquerels (as in the case of radioactive decay), not hertz, since although the two are mathematically similar, by convention hertz implies regularity where becquerels implies the requirement of a time averaging operation. Thus, one becquerel is one event per second on average, whereas one hertz is one event per second on a regular cycle.

Cycle can also be a unit for measuring usage of reciprocating machines, especially presses, in which cases cycle refers to one complete revolution of the mechanism being measured (i.e. the shaft of a reciprocating engine).

Derived units include cycles per day (cpd) and cycles per year (cpy).

See also 

 Cycles per instruction (CPI)
 Heinrich Hertz
 Instructions per cycle (IPC)
 Instructions per second (IPS)
 MKS system of units a predecessor of the SI set of units
 Normalized frequency
 Radian per second
 Revolutions per minute (RPM)
 Turn (angle)

References

Units of frequency